Albert is a tiny crater on the Moon. It is near the site where Soviet lunar rover Lunokhod 1 landed in November 1970, in the Mare Imbrium region. Its diameter is 0.1 km. The name Albert does not refer to a specific person; it is a male name of German origin.

References

External links

Albert at The Moon Wiki 
 
 

Impact craters on the Moon
Mare Imbrium